(The Chimney Sweep, or The Indispensable Betrayers of Their Lordships out of Self-interest) is an opera in three acts by Antonio Salieri to a German libretto by Leopold Auenbrugger.

The musical work was referred to as a practice in "the [German] language" for Salieri, as Joseph II put it. Here, Salieri was able to create virtuoso roles for some of the most famous singers of Vienna: Caterina Cavalieri, who created the role of Konstanze in Mozart's Die Entführung aus dem Serail, and Ludwig Fischer, who created the role of Osmin in the same opera. Fräule Nannette (Cavalieri) sings brilliant showpiece arias in her quest for Volpino's love, notably "Wenn dem Adler das Gefieder", and Herr von Bär (Fischer) consistently exhibits his ursine qualities by going down to E2 and D2 his two arias. Additionally, the opera brings out very much humour and entertainment through Volpino's astute character and the ladies' infatuation with him.

Performance history
Commissioned by Emperor Joseph II for his German company, it was first performed on 30 April 1781 at the Burgtheater in Vienna. It was given 13 times between then and 5 July 1782. It later gained popularity in northern Germany, where it was consistently revived until the early 1900s.

The first performance in our days was on 14 November 2011 in Graz, Austria, the hometown of the librettist Leopold Auenbrugger. The opera saw its Australian premiere in English as The Chimney Sweep in 2014 by Pinchgut Opera.

Roles

Synopsis
Setting: The rich mansion of Frau von Habicht during the late 1800s, located in a German capital city.

An amorous intrigue in which Volpino, the chimney sweep, and Lisel, the cook, connive at receiving a dowry from their social betters, Herr von Bär and Herr von Wolf. Volpino accomplishes this task by enamoring Frau von Habicht and Fraule Nannette through music, later persuading the noblemen, who are wooing the ladies, to provide him money in order to disenchant the women.

Recordings

References

External links

 Libretto 
 , Patrice Michaels, Stephen Alltop conducting

German-language operas
Operas by Antonio Salieri
1781 operas
Operas
Opera world premieres at the Burgtheater